Ilie Sánchez Farrés (born 21 November 1990) is a Spanish professional footballer who plays as a defensive midfielder for Major League Soccer club Los Angeles FC.

Formed at Barcelona, where he was only a reserve, he spent most of his career in Major League Soccer, winning the U.S. Open Cup with Sporting Kansas City in 2017 and the Supporters' Shield and MLS Cup with Los Angeles FC in 2022.

Club career

Barcelona B
Born in Barcelona, Catalonia, Sánchez represented several clubs as a youth, including FC Barcelona from ages 7 to 9, returning to La Masia in 2007. In the 2009–10 season he made his professional debut in the Segunda División B, contributing 22 matches (one goal) as the B team returned to Segunda División after an 11-year absence.

Mainly a defensive midfielder, Sánchez was reconverted into a right-back by manager Luis Enrique, a former Barcelona player. He was also called by Pep Guardiola for the first team's pre-season in 2010.

1860 Munich
On 11 June 2014, both Sánchez and teammate Edu Bedia signed for TSV 1860 Munich of the German 2. Bundesliga. He made his league debut in the season opener, a 3–2 away defeat to 1. FC Kaiserslautern, and scored his only goal on 26 September to help to a 2–0 home win against SpVgg Greuther Fürth.

Sánchez was deemed surplus to requirements by manager Torsten Fröhling at the start of the 2015–16 campaign, and on 31 August he was loaned to Elche CF in the Spanish second tier. He scored once, the penalty winner in a 2–1 home victory over CA Osasuna on 8 November. Shortly after his return to his parent club, his contract was mutually annulled.

Sporting Kansas City
On 13 January 2017, Sánchez moved to Major League Soccer side Sporting Kansas City on a two-year deal. He played on 20 September as the team won the U.S. Open Cup with a 2–1 final victory over the New York Red Bulls; days later, he earned a U.S. green card which qualified him as a domestic player for MLS roster purposes.

Sánchez was named to the All-Star team at the end of the 2018 season in recognition of his play, notably ranking in the top five in nearly every passing and midfield statistic or metric. In 2019, he figured in Kansas City's run to the CONCACAF Champions League semi-finals, scoring in knockout games against Deportivo Toluca F.C. and C.A. Independiente de La Chorrera. On 29 September that year, he was sent off while conceding a late penalty from which the Portland Timbers drew 2–2 at Children's Mercy Park.

In August 2021, Sánchez took an assistant coaching role with the under-14 side as part of his B License course in the U.S. Soccer Coaching Education program. Following the year's campaign, his contract option was declined.

Los Angeles FC
On 12 January 2022, Sánchez signed a two-year contract with Los Angeles FC. He scored his first goal on 2 April in a 4–2 win at Orlando City SC, the only one of a season in which his team won the Supporters' Shield; he missed just one game, as a result of a red card in a 2–1 loss at the San Jose Earthquakes on 20 August. On 5 November, he scored the decisive goal of the penalty shootout win over the Philadelphia Union to secure the team's first MLS Cup.

Personal life
Sánchez's older brother Yuri was on the youth ranks of UE Cornellà at the same time as him, as an attacking midfielder. Having failed to join him as a fellow professional, he became an economist after graduating from the University of Barcelona.

Career statistics

Honours
Sporting Kansas City
U.S. Open Cup: 2017

Los Angeles FC
MLS Cup: 2022
Supporters' Shield: 2022

Individual
MLS All-Star: 2018, 2022

References

External links

1990 births
Living people
Spanish footballers
Footballers from Barcelona
Association football midfielders
Association football utility players
Segunda División players
Segunda División B players
UE Cornellà players
FC Barcelona Atlètic players
Elche CF players
2. Bundesliga players
TSV 1860 Munich players
Major League Soccer players
Sporting Kansas City players
Los Angeles FC players
Spanish expatriate footballers
Expatriate footballers in Germany
Expatriate soccer players in the United States
Spanish expatriate sportspeople in Germany
Spanish expatriate sportspeople in the United States